Ralf Sigvard Edström (born 7 October 1952) is a Swedish former professional footballer who played as a forward. Widely regarded as Sweden's best player in the 1970s, he started off his career with Degerfors IF in the late 1960s and went on to represent Åtvidabergs FF, PSV Eindhoven, IFK Göteborg, Standard Liege, and AS Monaco before retiring at Örgryte IS in 1985. A full international between 1972 and 1980, he won 40 caps for the Sweden national team and scored 15 goals. He represented his country at the 1974 and 1978 FIFA World Cups and was awarded Guldbollen as Sweden's best player in 1972 and 1974.

Club career 
Starting his career in Degerfors IF, a club known to produce many young talents, Edström moved to Åtvidabergs FF and became national champion in 1972. He moved to PSV Eindhoven in 1973 and was part of the team that became national champion in 1974/75 and 1975/76. On club level, he became not only Swedish Champion, but also Dutch (twice) and French Champion. He also won the Swedish, Dutch and Belgian Cups and was voted Swedish player of the year twice (1972 and 1974, winning Guldbollen). He injured his knee while at AS Monaco which prevented him from playing any games for Örgryte IS and ultimately led to his retirement from professional football in 1985.

International career 
Edström made 40 appearances for the Swedish national team and scored 15 times. He is most noted for his performance in the 1974 FIFA World Cup where he had a big part in Sweden finishing fifth, and he made six appearances and scored four goals during this tournament.

While representing Sweden at the 1978 FIFA World Cup in Argentina, Edström was arrested for speaking to a person in Buenos Aires; however, the Argentine military released him upon recognising its error (that he was not one of its citizens but a professional footballer who was in the country for the tournament it was hosting).

Personal life 
He has been an expert radio commentator since the 1980s.

Career statistics

Club 
Source

International 

Scores and results list Sweden's goal tally first, score column indicates score after each Edström goal.

Honours 
Åtvidabergs FF

 Allsvenskan: 1972
 Svenska Cupen: 1970–71

PSV Eindhoven

 Eredivisie: 1974–75, 1975–76
 KNVB Cup: 1973–74, 1975–76

IFK Göteborg

 Svenska Cupen: 1978–79

Standard Liege

 Belgian Cup: 1981

AS Monaco

 French Division 1: 1981–82
Individual
 Allsvenskan top scorer: 1972
 Guldbollen: 1972, 1974
World Soccer World XI: 1975
Swedish Football Hall of Fame: 2003

References

External links 

 

1952 births
Living people
Swedish footballers
Åtvidabergs FF players
Degerfors IF players
IFK Göteborg players
PSV Eindhoven players
AS Monaco FC players
Örgryte IS players
Expatriate footballers in the Netherlands
Expatriate footballers in Belgium
Expatriate footballers in France
Expatriate footballers in Monaco
Standard Liège players
Sweden international footballers
1974 FIFA World Cup players
1978 FIFA World Cup players
Swedish expatriate footballers
Swedish expatriate sportspeople in the Netherlands
Swedish expatriate sportspeople in Belgium
Swedish expatriate sportspeople in France
Swedish expatriate sportspeople in Monaco
Allsvenskan players
Ligue 1 players
Eredivisie players
Belgian Pro League players
Swedish association football commentators
Association football forwards
People from Degerfors Municipality
Sportspeople from Örebro County